Vernon Township is one of eleven townships in Jennings County, Indiana, United States. As of the 2010 census, its population was 2,809 and it contained 1,118 housing units.

Geography
The streams of Crooked Creek, Duck Branch, Goose Run and Huckleberry Branch run through this township.

Cities and towns
 North Vernon (southeast edge)
 Vernon (the county seat)

Unincorporated towns
 Grayford
 Walnut Ridge

Adjacent townships
 Center Township (north)
 Campbell Township (northeast)
 Bigger Township (east)
 Lovett Township (southwest)
 Spencer Township (west)

Cemeteries
The township contains six cemeteries: Baldwin, Coryell, Ebenezer, Stewart, Sullivan and Vernon.

Major highways
  Indiana State Road 3
  Indiana State Road 7

References
 U.S. Board on Geographic Names (GNIS)
 United States Census Bureau cartographic boundary files

External links
 Indiana Township Association
 United Township Association of Indiana

Townships in Jennings County, Indiana
Townships in Indiana